Batman's Hill in Melbourne, Australia was named for the Vandemonian adventurer and grazier John Batman. Now removed, the 18-metre-high hill was located to the south of today's Collins Street and Southern Cross railway station, and is the site of a steel marker the same height as the original hill.

The hill, on the traditional country of the Wurundjeri, was first claimed for John Fawkner by his representative Captain John Lancey of the Enterprize, who named it 'Pleasant Hill', and wrote to Fawkner in 1835,

In April 1836 the hill was settled by Batman and his family, who built a house at the base where Batman lived until his death in 1839. His widow and family then moved from the house and the government requisitioned the house for government offices.

In 1837, the Hoddle Grid, the first town plan was designed with Batman's Hill as its western boundary.  

The hill had many other uses, in February 1839 it acted as a grandstand for Melbourne's first horse race, with the site later the site of navigation beacons, and a hospital. Around the same time, Batman's Hill was also the site of the first cricket match played in Victoria by the founders of the Melbourne Cricket Club. The western slope of Batman's Hill was sold to the government in 1847 and a powder magazine was built.  At the foot of the slopes were tanning pits and melting works.

In 1853 the Victorian Government offered a concession to the Melbourne, Mount Alexander and Murray River Railway Company to build a railway from Melbourne to Echuca, including land to the east of Batman's Hill for the terminus. In 1856 the company failed, and was taken over by the government who formed the Victorian Railways to complete the works, the railway station being erected at Spencer Street in 1858. Growing traffic lead to an expansion of the freight sheds in 1863, with a contract being signed in November that year for the removal of the hill. Demolition was completed by the middle of 1866. Further changes came with the construction of the No 2 Goods Shed, the Railways Headquarters Building in Spencer Street, Flinders Street Viaduct, Flinders Street Extension and the retaining wall just south of the goods yards in the 1880s and 90s.

The site now forms the eastern border of the Melbourne Docklands (a precinct of the Docklands development is also named Batman's Hill) and is dominated by Southern Cross station and the Collins Street bridge built in 2002 to replicate the original curve and shape of the hill.  The new headquarters of The Age newspaper are located to the southern side of the bridge.

A significant portion of Batman's Hill is now being developed by the Walker Group as a commercial office precinct called Collins Square.

A 1920s hotel, the Batman's Hill Hotel was named after Batman's Hill.

Survey datum

Robert Hoddle used Batman's Hill as the datum for the cadastral survey of the land around Melbourne from 1837.  

A grid of orthogonal Section lines at one mile spacing, aligned with magnetic north, divided the land into one square mile (640 acre) sections for subdivision and land sales.  The section boundaries were adjusted for watercourses. The linear property boundaries, in the absence of pre-existing tracks, were natural locations for major roads.  For example: 
Swan Street, Riversdale Road and Somerville Road are on the east–west section line that passes through the datum.
Victoria Street and Barkers Road run east–west one mile to the north
Alexandra Parade and Racecourse Road run east–west two miles to the north
Royal Parade and Sydney Road run north–south along the section line passing through the datum.
Hoddle Street runs north–south two miles to the east
Springvale Road runs north–south twelve miles to the east

See also 
Melbourne Docklands

References

History of Melbourne
Melbourne City Centre